Anaxiphomorpha is a small Asian genus of "sword-tail crickets", in the subfamily Trigonidiinae and the tribe Trigonidiini.

Species
The Orthoptera Species File lists the following from southern China and Vietnam:
 Anaxiphomorpha biserratus Liu & Shi, 2015
 Anaxiphomorpha brachyapodemalis Gorochov, 1987 - type species - locality Hanoi, Vietnam
 Anaxiphomorpha brevisparamerus Liu & Shi, 2015
 Anaxiphomorpha hexagona Ma, 2018
 Anaxiphomorpha longiapodemalis Gorochov, 1987
 Anaxiphomorpha longiserratus Liu & Shi, 2015
 Anaxiphomorpha serratiprotuberus Liu & Shi, 2015

References

External links
 

Ensifera genera
Trigonidiidae
Orthoptera of Asia